Farm to Market Roads in Texas are owned and maintained by the Texas Department of Transportation (TxDOT).

FM 1000

Farm to Market Road 1000 (FM 1000) is located in Titus County.

FM 1000 begins at an intersection with SH 49, heading east on a two-lane undivided road. The road passes through areas of farms and woods with some homes, winding to the east. The highway makes a turn to the north and runs through more agricultural areas with some patches of woodland and residences. FM 1000 crosses a Union Pacific railroad line and enters the community of Cookville, heading northwest past a few homes and businesses, ending at US 67.

FM 1000 was first designated onto its current alignment on November 23, 1948. On September 27, 2001, the route was proposed to extend west from SH 49 to an intersection with US 271. The proposed extension of FM 1000 was extended further west on February 28, 2008, to reflect a planned relocation of US 271. On March 28, 2013, the section from US 271 to FM 1735 was redesignated as FM 4000 and the section from FM 1735 to SH 49 was removed from the state highway system due to change in the project scope.

FM 1001

Farm to Market Road 1001 (FM 1001) is located in Titus County.

FM 1001 begins at an intersection with US 67/Farm to Market Road 2348 just east of Mount Pleasant. The highway travels in a northeast direction and crosses I-30 before entering Argo. After leaving Argo, FM 1001 turns east and ends at an intersection with FM 1993/County Road 3425.

FM 1001 was designated on November 23, 1948, running from US 67 to Argo. The highway was extended to its current terminus at FM 1993 on October 29, 1953.

Junction list

FM 1002

Farm to Market Road 1002 (FM 1002) is located in Upshur County.

FM 1002 begins at an intersection with SH 155 north of Big Sandy. The highway intersects with SH 154 in Rhonesboro and ends at an intersection with FM 852 southeast of Winnsboro.

FM 1002 was designated on November 23, 1948, running from SH 155 northeast to Sandy Grove. The highway was extended further north to SH 154 in Rhonesboro on November 20, 1951. The last change came on April 25, 1978, when the highway was extended to FM 852.

Junction list

FM 1003

Farm to Market Road 1003 (FM 1003) is located in Hardin County.

FM 1003 begins at an intersection with FM 770 near the Big Thicket National Preserve. The highway travels in a predominately northern direction before reaching Honey Island, where the road has a short overlap with FM 1293. After leaving Honey Island, FM 1003 runs in a northeast direction before ending at an intersection with US 69/US 287.

FM 1003 was designated on November 23, 1948, running from US 69 to FM 770. The highway's description was changed on September 1, 1972, to show a break at FM 1293 in Honey Island.

Junction list

FM 1004

Farm to Market Road 1004 (FM 1004) is located in Jasper and Newton counties.

FM 1004 begins at an intersection with US 96/SH 62 in Buna. The highway travels through rural areas of Jasper County. FM 1004 turns east at Jasper County Road 626 and has an overlap with US 96 near Call Junction. The highway enters Call just east of the Jasper-Newton county line. FM 1004 runs south of E.O. Siecke State Forest before ending at an intersection with SH 87.

FM 1004 was designated on November 23, 1948, running from US 96 at Call Junction east to SH 87 at Front Creek. The highway was extended westward, southward and southeastward to US 96 in Buna on October 28, 1953. Most of this extension absorbed part of the cancelled FM 1407.

Junction list

FM 1005

Farm to Market Road 1005 (FM 1005) is located in Jasper County.

FM 1005 begins at an intersection with FM 1013 northeast of Kirbyville. The highway travels through Magnolia Springs and intersects FM 252 northeast of town before ending at an intersection with US 96.

FM 1005 was designated on November 23, 1948, running from US 96 in Kirbyville southward  toward Call. The highway was extended to FM 1004 at Call on November 23, 1949. Later that year on November 20, the highway was extended to US 96 at Zion Hill, absorbing all of the cancelled FM 1006. FM 1006 was reassigned to a road in Orange County. The last change came on December 1, 1958, when the section of FM 1005 from Mount Union to Call was transferred to FM 1013.

Junction list

FM 1006

Farm to Market Road 1006 (FM 1006) is located in Orange County.

FM 1006 begins at an intersection with SH 87 in southwestern Orange near Orange County Airport. The highway travels around the southern part of the town and turns north onto Bridge Street near the Sabine River (the Louisiana state line). FM 1006 travels north on Bridge Street before ending at an intersection with Bus. US 90.

The current FM 1006 was designated on December 17, 1952, running from SH 87 to US 90, absorbing Spur 171 in the process.

Junction list

FM 1006 (1948)

The first FM 1006 was designated on November 23, 1948, running from US 96 to Magnolia Springs. This highway was cancelled on January 16, 1952, with the mileage being transferred to FM 1005.

FM 1007

Farm to Market Road 1007 (FM 1007) is located in Jasper County.

FM 1008

Farm to Market Road 1008 (FM 1008) is located in Liberty County. It runs from SH 321 in Dayton via Kenefick to SH 321 north of Dayton.

On January 25, 1950, the western terminus was relocated, absorbing a  section of FM 686. On November 20, 1951, the road was extended northeast  to Kenefick. On December 17, 1952, the road was extended northeast  from Kenefick. On August 24, 1955, the road was extended north  to FM 164. On October 3, 1955, the road was extended to SH 321, 13 miles north of Dayton, replacing FM 164. On December 18, 1956, a  section from Huffman to SH 321 in Dayton was transferred to FM 1960.

FM 1009

Farm to Market Road 1009 (FM 1009) is located in Liberty and Jefferson counties.

FM 1010

Farm to Market Road 1010 (FM 1010) is located in Liberty County.

FM 1011

Farm to Market Road 1011 (FM 1011) is located in Liberty County.

FM 1012

Farm to Market Road 1012 (FM 1012) is located in Newton County.

FM 1013

Farm to Market Road 1013 (FM 1013) is located in Tyler, Jasper and Newton counties.

FM 1013 begins at an intersection with US 69/US 287 in the community of Hillister. The highway travels in a mostly eastern direction and intersects FM 92 in the town of Spurger. East of Spurger, FM 1013 crosses over the Neches River and intersects with FM 1005 before entering the town of Kirbyville. In Kirbyville, the highway intersects FM 252 and briefly turns southeast before turning back east at Main Street. FM 1013 intersects US 96 and turns south onto Elizabeth Avenue and leaves town at FM 82. The highway travels in a mostly southern direction before ending at an intersection with FM 1004 in Call.

FM 1013 was designated on November 23, 1948, running from US 69 at Hillister to FM 92 at Spurger. The highway was extended to FM 1004 at Call on December 5, 1958, absorbing sections of FM 1005 and all of FM 2304. The last change came on April 30, 1962, with the break at FM 92 being removed and FM 1013 being slightly re-routed through Spurger.

Junction list

FM 1014

Farm to Market Road 1014 (FM 1014) is located in Tyler County.

FM 1015

Farm to Market Road 1015 (FM 1015) is located in Hidalgo County.

FM 1016

Farm to Market Road 1016 (FM 1016) is located in Hidalgo County. The highway is known locally as S. Conway Road in Mission and Military Highway in McAllen.

FM 1016 begins at I-2/US 83 in Mission, with Conway Road continuing into the city as SH 107. The highway travels in a southern direction and turns southeast near the Madero neighborhood, with the highway running in close proximity to the Rio Grande. FM 1016 turns east at FM 494 and runs through less developed areas of the city. The highway crosses FM 396 and enters McAllen after the intersection with Shary Road. Between FM 396 and Spur 115, FM 1016 runs through a heavily industrialized area with many business parks. The highway travels through a mainly rural area before ending at an intersection with SH 336.

FM 1016 was designated on November 23, 1948, running from US 83 in Mission to SH 336 south of McAllen as a redesignation of part of SH 107. A small section of the highway in McAllen was transferred to FM 1926 on June 10, 1952. Part of FM 1016 in Mission was transferred to SH 107 on May 21, 1979. The highway was relocated on January 26, 1983, between FM 494 and Spur 115. On December 18, 1986, FM 1016 was relocated west of Spur 115. On June 27, 1995, the entire route was redesignated Urban Road 1016 (UR 1016). The designation reverted to FM 1016 with the elimination of the Urban Road system on November 15, 2018.

FM 1017

Farm to Market Road 1017 (FM 1017) is located in Jim Hogg, Starr and Hidalgo counties.

FM 1017 begins at an intersection with US 281/SH 186 in San Manuel-Linn. The highway travels in a slight northwest direction through the town and intersects FM 3250 just west of the town. FM 1017 travels through La Reforma before entering San Isidro, intersecting FM 2294. The highway continues to run through rural areas before entering La Gloria, beginning an overlap with FM 755. After leaving FM 755, FM 1017 travels in a westward direction before turning towards the north at FM 2686. The highway travels in a mostly northern direction before ending at an intersection with SH 285 in Hebbronville.

FM 1017 was then extended to SH 285 near Hebbronville on November 20, 1951. On June 10, 1952, a section of FM 1017 was transferred to FM 755. There was a proposed extension of the highway to SH 359 on August 29, 1989, but this was cancelled as the court commissioner of Jim Hogg County did not accept the extension.

Junction list

FM 1018

Farm to Market Road 1018 (FM 1018) is located in Willacy County.

FM 1019

Farm to Market Road 1019 (FM 1019) is located in Dimmit County.

FM 1020

Farm to Market Road 1020 (FM 1020) is located in Karnes County.

FM 1020 (1948)

The original FM 1020 was designated on November 23, 1948, from SH 41 southwest . FM 1020 was cancelled on April 18, 1949, and became a portion of FM 674 (now RM 674).

FM 1021

Farm to Market Road 1021 (FM 1021) is located in Maverick County.

FM 1021 begins at an intersection with US 57 in Eagle Pass. The highway intersects with FM 375 and FM 3443 in the city. FM 1021 runs along the southern boundary of Las Quintas Fronterizas and crosses Loop 480 before running on the boundaries of Chula Vista and Rosita. After leaving the Eagle Pass area, the highway runs through mostly rural areas of the county before entering El Indio. FM 1021 ends south of El Indio with the road continuing as the unimproved Eagle Pass Road, which transitions into FM 1472 in Webb County.

FM 1021 was designated on November 23, 1948, running from SH 85 (which later became US 277) near Eagle Pass to El Indio. The highway's beginning was moved to SH 76 (now US 57) on April 21, 1949.

Junction list

RM 1022

Ranch to Market Road 1022 (RM 1022) is located in Uvalde County.

RM 1022 begins at a dead end near the former mining community of Dabney. The highway travels in an east direction, with the highway forking northeast of the town, with the other section of RM 1022 traveling to the main entrance of the Vulcan Materials Company. The highway turns north and runs parallel to a rail line until passing in between the White Company Lake and the Uvalde Rock Asphalt Company Lake. RM 1022 runs by several ranches and rock quarries before ending at an intersection with US 90.

RM 1022 was designated on November 23, 1948, as FM 1022, running from US 90 west of Uvalde to Blewett. The highway was extended to Dabney on November 20, 1951. On October 17, 1959, the road was redesignated as RM 1022.

FM 1023

Farm to Market Road 1023 (FM 1023) is located in Uvalde County.

FM 1023 begins at intersection with FM 1049/County Road 301 south of Knippa. The highway is signed as north-south despite running in a southwest/northeast direction for most of its length. FM 1023 enters Uvalde near Garner Field, where it intersects with FM 1574. FM 1023 runs along Garner Field Road and has a short overlap with US 90 before running on 4th Street. The highway runs along 4th Street in eastern Uvalde before ending at an intersection with FM 2369.

FM 1023 was designated on December 20, 1948, running from US 90 east of Uvalde to Garner Field. This section of highway was formerly a part of FM 187. FM 1023 was extended north from US 90 to FM 2369 on May 22, 1959. this section was rerouted later, with the old route becoming FM 3447 on January 26, 1983. On May 6, 1964, FM 1023 was extended north from Garner Field to US 90. On October 15, 1965, the section between US 90 and Garner Field was renumbered FM 1574. The highway was extended to County Road 302 on June 2, 1967. The last change came on July 11, 1968, when FM 1023 was extended to FM 1049.

Junction list

RM 1024

Ranch to Market Road 1024 (RM 1024) is located in Val Verde County. It runs from US 90 near Comstock northward and westward to an intersection with Langtry Road and Pandale Road near Pandale.

On July 15, 1949, FM 1024 was extended northwestward . On June 21, 1951, FM 1024 was extended northwestward . On January 23, 1953, FM 1024 was extended northwest . On October 29, 1953, FM 1024 was extended northwest . On October 17, 1959, FM 1024 was redesignated as RM 1024. On September 27, 1960, RM 1024 was extended northwestward . On May 2, 1962, RM 1024 was extended northwest . On May 5, 1966, RM 1024 was extended northwest . On June 2, 1967, RM 1024 was extended westward . On November 5, 1971, RM 1024 was extended westward  to its current terminus.

FM 1025

Farm to Market Road 1025 (FM 1025) is located in Zavala County.

FM 1026

Farm to Market Road 1026 (FM 1026) is located in Coleman County.

FM 1027

Farm to Market Road 1027 (FM 1027) is located in Eastland County.

FM 1028

Farm to Market Road 1028 (FM 1028) is located in McCulloch County.

FM 1029

Farm to Market Road 1029 (FM 1029) is located in Mills County.

FM 1030

Farm to Market Road 1030 (FM 1030) is located in San Saba County.

FM 1031

Farm to Market Road 1031 (FM 1031) is located in San Saba County.

FM 1032

Farm to Market Road 1032 (FM 1032) is located in Stephens County.

FM 1032 was designated on November 23, 1948, on its current route.

FM 1033

Farm to Market Road 1033 (FM 1033) is located in Childress and Cottle counties.

FM 1034

Farm to Market Road 1034 (FM 1034) is located in Childress County.

FM 1035

Farm to Market Road 1035 (FM 1035) is located in Collingsworth County.

FM 1036

Farm to Market Road 1036 (FM 1036) is located in Collingsworth County.

FM 1037

Farm to Market Road 1037 (FM 1037) is located in Cottle County. The road begins at US 62/US 83 in Paducah, and continues west, then south, ending at County Road 230 in Cottle County north of Delwin.

FM 1037 was designated on November 23, 1948, from US 70 east of Paducah west  to end of pavement on Backus Avenue in Paducah. On September 21, 1955, another segment of FM 1037 was designated from US 83 west to US 70 west of Paducah. This created a gap in the route's mileage. On January 22, 1957, FM 1037 was extended from the end of pavement on Backus Avenue to US 83. This closed the gap. On October 31, 1958, FM 1037 was extended south  from US 70 west of Paducah.

FM 1038

Farm to Market Road 1038 (FM 1038) is located in Cottle County.

FM 1039

Farm to Market Road 1039 (FM 1039) is located in Foard County.

FM 1040

Farm to Market Road 1040 (FM 1040) is located in Live Oak County.

FM 1040 (1948)

The original FM 1040 was designated on November 23, 1948, from US 70 in Thalia southward . FM 1040 was cancelled on April 20, 1949, and became a portion of FM 262.

FM 1041

Farm to Market Road 1041 (FM 1041) is located in Hall County.

FM 1042

Farm to Market Road 1042 (FM 1042) is located in Live Oak County.

FM 1042 (1948)

Six months later FM 1042 was cancelled in lieu of extending FM 656.

FM 1043

Farm to Market Road 1043 (FM 1043) is located in Knox County.

FM 1044

Farm to Market Road 1044 (FM 1044) is located in Comal and Guadalupe counties.

FM 1044's northern terminus is in central New Braunfels, at an intersection with the northbound frontage road of I-35 at exit 185. Its southern terminus is at FM 78 east of Marion.

The current FM 1044 designation was established on October 28, 1953, connecting US 81 (now I-35) to FM 78.

FM 1044 (1948)

On December 17, 1952, it was extended south . FM 1044 was cancelled on October 28, 1953, and its mileage was transferred to FM 266.

FM 1045

Farm to Market Road 1045 (FM 1045) is located in Motley County.

FM 1046

Farm to Market Road 1046 (FM 1046) is located in Wheeler County.

FM 1047

Farm to Market Road 1047 (FM 1047) is located in Hamilton, Mills and Lampasas counties.

The highway travels through mostly rural areas and intersects US 84 near Star. FM 1047 then crosses the Lampasas River before ending at an intersection with FM 2005 southwest of Hamilton.

FM 1047 was designated on November 23, 1948, running from FM 581 to Lampasas County Road 120. On May 23, 1951, the highway was extended to the Mills county line. FM 1047 was extended to US 84 in Star on November 20, 1951, replacing Spur 183. The last change came on May 2, 1962, when the highway was extended to its current terminus at FM 2005, absorbing FM 2707 in the process.

Junction list

FM 1048

Farm to Market Road 1048 (FM 1048) is located in Falls County.

FM 1049

Farm to Market Road 1049 (FM 1049) is located in Uvalde County.

RM 1050

Ranch to Market Road 1050 (RM 1050) is located in Uvalde County.

RM 1050 begins at an intersection with US 83 near Garner State Park. The highway travels in an eastern direction along the park's northern boundary before intersecting RM 2748. RM 1050 travels through hilly terrain of the Texas Hill Country before entering Utopia, ending at an intersection with RM 187.

RM 1050 was designated on November 23, 1948, as Farm to Market Road 1050 (FM 1050), running from FM 187 (now RM 187) in Utopia to US 83. On October 17, 1959, FM 1050 was changed to RM 1050.

Junction list

FM 1051

Farm to Market Road 1051 (FM 1051) is located in Uvalde County.

The route begins at an intersection with US 83 southwest of Concan and travels northwest to the community of Reagan Wells before state maintenance ends.

FM 1051 was designated on November 23, 1948, on its current route.

FM 1052

Farm to Market Road 1052 (FM 1052) is located in Uvalde County.

FM 1053

FM 1054

Farm to Market Road 1054 (FM 1054) is located in Lynn and Borden counties.

FM 1055

Farm to Market Road 1055 (FM 1055) is located in Deaf Smith, Castro and Lamb counties.

FM 1056

Farm to Market Road 1056 (FM 1056) is located in Collingsworth County.

FM 1056 (1948)

The original FM 1056 was designated on December 16, 1948, from SH 86 at Nazareth northward  to a road intersection. FM 1056 was cancelled on May 23, 1951, and became a portion of FM 168.

FM 1057

Farm to Market Road 1057 (FM 1057) is located in Deaf Smith and Castro counties.

FM 1058

Farm to Market Road 1058 (FM 1058) is located in Castro County.

FM 1059

Farm to Market Road 1059 (FM 1059) is located in Hutchinson and Carson counties.

FM 1060

Farm to Market Road 1060 (FM 1060) is located in Sherman and Moore counties.

RM 1061

Ranch to Market Road 1061 (RM 1061) is located in Potter and Oldham counties.

RM 1061 begins at an intersection with BL I-40 in Amarillo. The highway is known locally as Tascosa Road and runs northwest through the city, passing several subdivisions. RM 1061 leaves the city before having an interchange with Loop 335. The highway travels in a northwestern direction and turns to the west at Melfrank Road. RM 1061 runs along the southern boundary of Bishop Hills and turns back to the northwest near Ranch Road. After passing Ranch View Drive the highway runs through mainly rural areas of the county. RM 1061 intersects with RM 2381 north of Bushland. The highway runs through rural areas before ending at an intersection with US 385 in Tascosa.

On September 21, 1955, the road was extended northwest  to a point near Ady and was redesignated as RM 1061. RM 1061 was extended to Tascosa at SH 51 on November 21, 1956 (which became US 385 in 1959). On June 27, 1995, the section between Business I-40 and Loop 335 was redesignated Urban Road 1061 (UR 1061). The designation reverted to RM 1061 with the elimination of the Urban Road system on November 15, 2018.

Junction list

FM 1062

Farm to Market Road 1062 (FM 1062) is located in Deaf Smith and Randall counties.

FM 1063

Farm to Market Road 1063 (FM 1063) is located in Williamson County.

FM 1063 (1948)

The original FM 1063 was designated on December 16, 1948, from US 62 at Cone, westward and southward to Farmer. On July 14, 1949, the road was extended west  from Farmer to a road intersection and east  from US 62 to a road intersection. On September 28, 1949, the road was extended west to FM 378. On December 17, 1952, the road was extended east to FM 651. On November 21, 1956, the road was extended east to FM 28. FM 1063 was cancelled on November 1, 1960, and became a portion of FM 193.

FM 1064

Farm to Market Road 1064 (FM 1064) is located in Dawson County.

FM 1065

Farm to Market Road 1065 (FM 1065) is located in Briscoe and Floyd counties.

FM 1066

Farm to Market Road 1066 (FM 1066) is located in Gaines and Dawson counties.

FM 1067

Farm to Market Road 1067 (FM 1067) is located in Gaines County.

FM 1068

Farm to Market Road 1068 (FM 1068) is located in San Patricio County.

FM 1068 (1948)

The original FM 1068 was designated on December 16, 1948, from US 84 westward  to the Garza-Lynn county line. Three months later FM 1068 was cancelled and became a portion of FM 211.

FM 1068 (1951)

The second FM 1068 was designated on May 23, 1951, from US 181 at Taft eastward and northward  to Plymouth Oil Field. FM 1068 was cancelled on March 24, 1958, and became a portion of FM 631.

FM 1069

Farm to Market Road 1069 (FM 1069) is located in Aransas and San Patricio counties. It runs from Business SH 35-L in Rockport to Redfish Bay at Port Ingelside.

On September 19, 1951, the road was extended northeast  to FM 881. On October 29, 1953, the road was extended southwest  to FM 632 (now SH 361) at Ingleside. On November 20, 1953, the road was extended to Redfish Bay, creating a gap at FM 632 and replacing FM 2094. On November 24, 1959, the road was extended southeast  to SH 35. On January 1, 1966, the gap at Ingelside was removed following a rerouting of FM 632. On December 22, 1992, a  section from FM 881 to the then-new location of SH 35 was transferred to SH 188. On August 18, 1993, a  section from then-new SH 35 to existing SH 35 was transferred to SH 188, while FM 1069 was rerouted over FM 881 to Business SH 35-L. On April 3, 2006, a section of FM 1069 in Rockport was redesignated as Loop 70.

FM 1069 (1948)

Four months later FM 1069 was cancelled and became a portion of FM 594 (now FM 179).

FM 1070

Farm to Market Road 1070 (FM 1070) is located in Hale County.

FM 1071

Farm to Market Road 1071 (FM 1071) is located in Hale and Lamb counties.

FM 1072

Farm to Market Road 1072 (FM 1072) is located in Lamb County.

FM 1073

Farm to Market Road 1073 (FM 1073) is located in Freestone County.

FM 1073 (1948)

The original FM 1073 was designated on December 16, 1948, from US 84 at Shallowater southward  to a road intersection. On July 14, 1949, the road extended south . On October 28, 1953, the road extended south to US 62. On October 14, 1954, the road extended south to the Lubbock-Lynn county line, replacing FM 1316. Twelve days later, the road extended south to FM 211. On May 2, 1962, the road extended south to FM 1317. FM 1073 was cancelled on August 20, 1964, and became a portion of FM 179.

FM 1074

Farm to Market Road 1074 (FM 1074) is located in San Patricio County.

FM 1074 (1948)

The original FM 1074 was designated on December 16, 1948, from US 87 north of Tahoka northeastward  via Wilson to the Lynn-Lubbock County Line. Three months later FM 1074 was cancelled and became a portion of FM 400.

FM 1075

Farm to Market Road 1075 (FM 1075) is located in Castro, Swisher, Randall and Armstrong counties.

FM 1076

Farm to Market Road 1076 (FM 1076) is located in Terry County.

RM 1077

Ranch to Market Road 1077 (RM 1077) is located in Bandera County.

The highway travels in a northeast direction for most of its length before ending at an intersection with SH 173 just south of Bandera.

The highway was extended another  on July 11, 1968. An extension of RM 1077 to the Hill Country SNA was proposed on August 28, 1989, but was cancelled on September 25, 2003, as the county could not secure right of way.

FM 1077 (1948)

The original FM 1077 was designated on December 16, 1948, running from the New Mexico state line to US 380 in Plains. On March 30, 1955, the road was signed, but not designated, as SH 337 to match New Mexico Highway 337. The highway was cancelled on September 26, 1963, with the mileage being transferred to US 82, which also replaced New Mexico Highway 337.

FM 1078

Farm to Market Road 1078 (FM 1078) is located in Orange County.

FM 1078 (1948)

The original FM 1078 was designated on December 16, 1948, from US 80 in Clyde southward  to a road intersection. On July 14, 1949, the road was extended south  to another road intersection. On May 23, 1951, the road was extended south to SH 36. FM 1078 was cancelled on July 11, 1951, and transferred to FM 604.

FM 1078 (1951)

The second FM 1078 was designated on July 25, 1951, from US 81 (now I-35) in Kyle northwest  to a road intersection in Hays City. The road FM 1078 ended at the west end became part of FM 966 on November 20, 1951. FM 1078 was cancelled on October 27, 1952, and was transferred to FM 150 (now RM 150); note that FM 150 replaced FM 966 on May 25, 1955.

FM 1078 (1952)

The third FM 1078 was designated on December 17, 1952, from US 77 near Lewisville west to FM 1830 in Bartonville. FM 1078 was cancelled on January 6, 1955, and became a portion of FM 407.

FM 1079

Farm to Market Road 1079 (FM 1079) is located in Callahan County. It runs from FM 880 west to Cotton Wood.

FM 1079 was designated on December 16, 1948, from US 80 in Putnam southward  to a road intersection. On July 14, 1949, the road extended south  to another road intersection. On May 23, 1951, the road extended south to FM 880 at Cotton Wood. On September 5, 1951, this routing of FM 1079 became a portion of FM 880, while FM 1079 was reassigned to the old route of FM 880.

FM 1080

Farm to Market Road 1080 (FM 1080) is located in Haskell County.

FM 1081

Farm to Market Road 1081 (FM 1081) is located in Dickens and Kent counties.

FM 1081 (1948)

The original FM 1081 was designated on December 16, 1948, from SH 24 (now US 380) at Rule northwest to Jud. On May 23, 1951, the road was extended northeast to SH 283 (now SH 6) in Rochester. FM 1081 was cancelled on August 5, 1955, and became a portion of FM 617.

FM 1082

Farm to Market Road 1082 (FM 1082) is located in Jones and Taylor counties.

FM 1083

Farm to Market Road 1083 (FM 1083) is located in Kent County.

FM 1084

Farm to Market Road 1084 (FM 1084) is located in Shackelford County.

FM 1085

Farm to Market Road 1085 (FM 1085) is located in Fisher, Jones and Taylor counties.

FM 1086

Farm to Market Road 1086 (FM 1086) is located in Taylor County.

FM 1087

Farm to Market Road 1087 (FM 1087) is located in Nacogdoches County.

FM 1088

Farm to Market Road 1088 (FM 1088) is located in Hudspeth County. It runs from SH 20 southwestward to the  Fort Hancock–El Porvenir International Bridge, where it crosses the Rio Grande to El Porvenir, Chihuahua, Mexico. The road and bridge provide a connection with Mexico Federal Highway 2.

FM 1088 was assigned its current northern terminus along SH 20 on September 5, 1973.

FM 1088 (1948)

FM 1088 was cancelled on December 7, 1972, and became a portion of FM 949.

FM 1089

Farm to Market Road 1089 (FM 1089) is located in Smith and Cherokee counties.

FM 1089 (1948)

The original FM 1089 was designated on December 16, 1948, from SH 35 at Old Ocean north to West Columbia/Pledger Road (later FM 1452, now FM 1301). FM 1089 was cancelled on June 9, 1958, and became a portion of FM 524.

FM 1090

Farm to Market Road 1090 (FM 1090) is located in Victoria and Calhoun counties.

FM 1090 (1948)

The original FM 1090 was designated on December 16, 1948, from FM 524 at Four Corners southwest to FM 457 at Cedar Lane. FM 1090 was cancelled on January 16, 1953, and transferred to FM 521.

FM 1091

Farm to Market Road 1091 (FM 1091) is located in Live Oak County.

FM 1091 (1948)

The original FM 1091 was designated on December 16, 1948, from SH 35 in Angleton to the north end of the Bastrop Bayou Bridge. Seven months later FM 1091 was cancelled and became a portion of FM 523.

FM 1092

Farm to Market Road 1092 (FM 1092) is located in Harris and Fort Bend counties. Known locally as Murphy Road, it runs from SH 6 in Missouri City north to I-69/US 59 in Houston.

FM 1093

Farm to Market Road 1093 (FM 1093) is located in Colorado, Wharton, Austin, Fort Bend and Harris counties. It runs from FM 3013 in Eagle Lake to I-610 in Houston.

FM 1093 serves as the free frontage roads for the Westpark Tollway from the tollway's western terminus to its interchange with FM 1464 in Clodine. Beyond this interchange, FM 1093 continues along Westheimer Road to its terminus at IH 610 near The Galleria shopping mall.

FM 1093 was designated on December 16, 1948, from FM 359 at Flewellen via Gaston to Post Oak Road west of Houston. On July 9, 1951, the road was extended west  to SH 36 at Wallis, replacing FM 1094 and creating a concurrency with FM 359. On January 25, 1971, the road was shortened to end at FM 3013, as a  section from US 90A to FM 3013 was transferred to FM 3013. On June 27, 1995, the section between SH 99 and I-610 was redesignated Urban Road 1093 (UR 1093). The designation of this section reverted to FM 1093 with the elimination of the Urban Road system on November 15, 2018.

Junction list

FM 1094

Farm to Market Road 1094 (FM 1094) is located in Austin County. It runs from FM 109 at New Ulm southeast to SH 36 at Sealy.

On November 20, 1951, the road was extended  to FM 1088 (now FM 949). On September 29, 1954, the road was extended  to SH 36 at Sealy, replacing FM 2142.

FM 1094 (1948)

The original FM 1094 was designated on December 16, 1948, from FM 359 at Fulshear to Simonton. On July 22, 1949, the road was extended southwest  to SH 36 at Wallis. FM 1094 was cancelled on July 9, 1951, and became a portion of FM 1093.

FM 1095

Farm to Market Road 1095 (FM 1095) is located in Matagorda County. It runs from SH 35 east of Blessing to Collegeport.

On July 22, 1949, FM 1095 was extended south and west  to Collegeport.

FM 1096

Farm to Market Road 1096 (FM 1096) is located in Wharton County.

FM 1096 begins as a two-lane road on FM 442 northeast of Lane City. From there, FM 1096 goes north-northeast  to its intersection with FM 3012. Also known as North Iago Road, the highway continues north-northeast  to Barker Cutoff. North Iago Road extends past Barker Cutoff in the same direction to intersect with County Road 160 (CR 160) and CR 153 before coming to a dead end short of the San Bernard River.

On July 28, 1955, FM 1096 was established from FM 1301 at Iago in Wharton County southwest to FM 442. A new segment  in length was added on June 28, 1963.

Junction list

FM 1096 (1948)

The original FM 1096 was designated on December 16, 1948, from SH 60 at Wadsworth west to a county road. FM 1096 was extended west to FM 1095 and FM 460 on September 29, 1954. FM 1096 was cancelled on October 15, 1954, and became a portion of FM 521.

FM 1097

Farm to Market Road 1097 (FM 1097) is located in Walker and Montgomery counties. Most of the road has only two lanes each direction. There are very few traffic lights on the highway.

FM 1097 was first designated on December 16, 1948. The highway traveled from an intersection with FM 149 north of Montgomery along its present route to an intersection with U.S. Route 75 in Willis. On July 22 of the next year, the designation was extended  to the Walker County border. The road was extended  eastward, to the highway's present eastern terminus, on November 20, 1951. On May 2, 1962, the highway was extended  northwestward to its present northern terminus.

Junction list

FM 1098

Farm to Market Road 1098 (FM 1098) is located in Waller County. It runs from FM 1488 northeast of Hempstead south to US 290 in Prairie View.

FM 1098 was designated on December 16, 1948, from Spur 96 (former SH 244) at Prairie View College north  to a road intersection. On June 8, 1949, the route was shortened  to end at a county road intersection at Field's Store School. On July 9, 1951, the road was extended to US 290 southeast of Hempstead, replacing a portion of Spur 96. On January 16, 1953, a 12.3 mile section of FM 1098 was transferred to FM 362 and FM 1488, while a loop connection of FM 1098 was added around Prairie View College, replacing Loop 96. On September 29, 1976, the road was rerouted around the west side of Prairie View A & M College over the loop connection and the section through campus was removed from the highway system.

FM 1099

Farm to Market Road 1099 (FM 1099) is located in Atascosa County.

Notes

References

+10
Farm to market roads 1000
Farm to Market Roads 1000